The United Nations Educational, Scientific and Cultural Organization (UNESCO) designates World Heritage Sites of outstanding universal value to cultural or natural heritage which  have been nominated by countries which are signatories to the UNESCO World Heritage Convention, established in 1972. Cultural heritage consists of monuments (such as architectural works, monumental sculptures, or inscriptions), groups of buildings, and sites (including archaeological sites). Natural features (consisting of physical and biological formations), geological and physiographical formations (including habitats of threatened species of animals and plants), and natural sites which are important from the point of view of science, conservation or natural beauty, are defined as natural heritage. Georgia ratified the convention on 4 November 1992.

, Georgia has four sites on the list and a further fourteen on the tentative list. The first two sites inscribed to the list were the Historical Monuments of Mtskheta and the site comprising Bagrati Cathedral and Gelati Monastery, in 1994. However, due to major reconstruction detrimental to its integrity and authenticity, Bagrati Cathedral was put to the List of World Heritage in Danger in 2010 and then delisted as a World Heritage Site in 2017. Upper Svaneti was listed in 1996 and the most recent site listed was the Colchic Rainforests and Wetlands, in 2021. The latter is the only natural site of Georgia, the other three are of the cultural type.

World Heritage Sites
UNESCO lists sites under ten criteria; each entry must meet at least one of the criteria. Criteria i through vi are cultural, and vii through x are natural.

Tentative list
In addition to sites inscribed on the World Heritage List, member states can maintain a list of tentative sites that they may consider for nomination. Nominations for the World Heritage List are only accepted if the site was previously listed on the tentative list. , Georgia maintains fourteen properties on its tentative list.

See also
Tourism in Georgia

References

External links
 

Georgia

World Heritage Sites